Dame-Marie may refer to several communes in France:

Dame-Marie, Eure, in the Eure département
Dame-Marie, Orne, in the Orne département 
Dame-Marie-les-Bois, in the Indre-et-Loire département

It is also the name of a commune and town in Haiti:
Dame-Marie, a commune in the Grand'Anse department
Dame Marie City, the main city of Dame-Marie commune

See also
Dammarie (disambiguation)